Deborah Estefanía Romero Estrada (born 10 January 1997) is a Mexican football defender who currently plays for Club America  of the Liga MX Femenil.

See also
 List of people from Morelos, Mexico

References

External links 
 

1997 births
Living people
Footballers from Morelos
Women's association football defenders
Mexico women's youth international footballers
Mexican women's footballers
Liga MX Femenil players
Deportivo Toluca F.C. (women) footballers
Club América (women) footballers
Mexican footballers